Pyrausta flavidiscata is a moth in the family Crambidae. It is found in Central America.

References

Moths described in 1913
flavidiscata
Moths of Central America